Kukatpally is a suburb located in north western part of Hyderabad in the Indian state of Telangana. It is the headquarters of Balanagar mandal in Malkajgiri revenue division of Medchal-Malkajgiri district.  It was a municipality prior to its merger into the Greater Hyderabad Municipal Corporation, now it is the headquarters of "North Zone of GHMC".

It has road connectivity and proximity to the Information Technology hub of Hitech city.

Demographics
Geo coordinates of Kukatpally is 17°29′N 78°25′E. The language spoken is predominantly Telugu.  It is one of the busiest business hubs in Hyderabad famous for its clothing and eateries. It has the largest density of population within Hyderabad with 33,076 persons per km2.

History
Kukatpally used to be an Industrial corridor in the northwestern part of Hyderabad. Its population began to grow after the early 1990s, with many people migrating from 
Andhra Pradesh and settling in and around Kukatpally.

Economy
The presence of Mumbai national highway and Kukatpally Housing board has led to a large scale boom in retail activity and currently Kukatpally is a commercial hub in the north western part of Hyderabad. The land prices of Kukatpally are higher when compared to most of Hyderabad. There are some residential high-rise apartments like Emami Swanlake Apartments etc.

The Min Land Cost starts from 50000 per square yard and higher at 250000 per square yard.

Where as the residential flat price range min of 4500 PerSft to max of 8000 PerSft.

Industries
There are many small scale industries based in Kukatpally - Sanathnagar belt. The major industries are located in Prasanth Nagar which comprises both manufacturing, assembling, mechanical works.

Offices
Kukatpally is a hub for SME offices (Nosch Labs, LIC, IELTS).

Colleges
The place is also a hub for prestigious colleges & institutes like Holy Mary College, Tapasya College of Commerce and Management, Hamstech College of Creative Education and Avinash College. It is also home to the All India Institute of Technology.

Transport

Kukatpally is well connected by road, rail and air. The nearest airport is Rajiv Gandhi International Airport, Shamshabad. The railway station for this area is Lingampally. It has three Metro Stations at Kukatpally Metro, KPHB Metro, Balanagar Metro (Moosapet) and can also be reached by MMTS near to Hitech city/ Bharathnagar. TSRTC operates the bus in this area it has excellent connectivity with almost all the parts of Hyderabad.TSRTC maintains a depot at Kukatpally Y Junction.

References

External links 

https://metromanagement.in/
https://reax.in/
Neighbourhoods in Hyderabad, India